A wardmote was a meeting of the inhabitants of a ward, or a court held in the ward, to try defaults in matters relating to the watch, police, and the like.

The term is used in York, London, and Faversham, and was also used by the Chartists.

City of London
Wardmotes still take place once a year in each of the 25 wards of the City of London.

The wardmotes are traditionally opened by a proclamation from the ward beadle, for example:

The wardmotes are traditionally closed by a proclamation from the beadle, for example:

References 

City of London